Iddarammayilatho is a 2013 Indian Telugu-language romantic action film written and directed by Puri Jagannadh. It stars Allu Arjun, Amala Paul, and Catherine Tresa while Brahmanandam, Ali, Shawar Ali, Nassar, Pragathi, Tanikella Bharani, Tulasi, Subbaraju, and Rao Ramesh play supporting roles. The film was entirely shot in Spain and Paris. Bandla Ganesh has produced the film under Parameswara Art Productions. The film was simultaneously dubbed and released in Malayalam as Romeo & Juliets. Iddarammayilatho was released in 1,600 theaters worldwide on 31 May 2013. The film was above average grosser at box office.

Plot
Akanksha finds a diary in her flat in Barcelona, and out of curiosity, she starts reading the book, which unfolds the romantic drama between Sanju Reddy and Komali Sankaraabharanam. Akanksha gets engaged in Paris with her father's henchman Shawar Ali. Incidentally, she runs into Sanju and gets to know him. 

Sanju is an engineer-turned-lead guitarist of a music band, and makes his living through the stage and street performances. As narrated in the diary, Komali comes from an orthodox Telugu Brahmin family. She is interested in classical music and ends up learning the violin at a musical school in Barcelona under fiddle professor, Brahma. In a twist of fate, she falls in love with Sanju and gets approval for their inter-caste marriage, from their parents in India. Komali unknowingly gets caught after video footage that she accidentally shot while Shawar Ali kills the Spanish ambassador, in the process of money laundering. 

Sanju saves Komali from these henchmen, on a couple of occasions; this is where the story in the diary ends abruptly. Out of curiosity, Akanksha starts questioning Sanju about their love story and, in the process, ends up with disturbing facts. On continuous asking by Akanksha, Sanju tells her that Komali is dead. It is then shown in a flashback that for fixing the marriage of Sanju and Komali, their parents had come to Spain. It was at that time that Komali is kidnapped by Shawar Ali's brother, and when Sanju comes to save her, Komali is murdered by Shawar Ali's brother. In a fit of rage, Sanju bashes up the whole gang, and Shawar Ali's brother goes into a coma. 

On hearing this, Akanksha feels sorry for Sanju and falls in love with him. She also tries to bring him out of the memory of Komali but in vain. Meanwhile, Akanksha spots Komali crossing a street. Akanksha runs to Sanju to tell him about Komali, and at that time, Sanju gets surrounded by Shawar Ali's men. Sanju, while bashing up Shawar Ali's men, tells Akanksha that it was his plan to trap her in his love to avenge the death of his and Komali's parents at the hands of Shawar Ali. It is then shown in a flashback that after beating up Shawar's brother, Sanju had taken Komali's body to the hospital, from where Sanju's father calls up the Central Minister to arrest Shawar Ali in Spain after watching the video footage. 

The Central minister then calls up Shawar Ali to finish off this trouble in order to save himself. Shawar Ali then goes to the hospital and kills Sanju's and Komali's parents and shoots Sanju and Komali, and they are presumed dead. However, Sanju and Komali didn't die. It is then revealed that Sanju has been waiting all this time to get his revenge and has made Akanksha the pawn in this game, and it was he who faxed their photo in order to make Shawar Ali jealous so that Shawar Ali will come himself to kill Sanju. Later, it is revealed that Komali is not dead and that they both wanted to avenge their parents' death. Sanju and Shawar engage in a battle in the forest where Sanju kills Shawar Ali with Akanksha's help. Sanju and Komali live happily, while Akanksha lives alone.

Cast

 Allu Arjun as Sanjay Reddy a.k.a. Sanju, an engineer-turned-lead guitarist
 Amala Paul as Komali Sankarabharanam, an orthodox Telugu Brahmin who falls in love with Sanju
 Catherine Tresa as Akanksha, a psychology student who finds a diary about Sanju and Komali
 Brahmanandam as Fiddle Brahma, a professor who teaches violin to Komali
 Ali as Gudivada Krishna
 Shawar Ali as Shawar Ali, a money launderer and Akanksha's father's henchman who kills Sanju's and Komali's parents
 Nassar as Sanju's father
 Pragathi as Sumathi, Sanju's mother
 Tanikella Bharani as Shankarabharanam, Komali's father
 Tulasi as Komali's mother
 Subbaraju as Shawar Ali's brother who kidnaps Komali and later becomes comatose
 Rao Ramesh as Akanksha's father and the Central Minister
 Mamilla Shailaja Priya as Akanksha's mother
 Srinivasa Reddy as Sanju's musical gang member
 Khayyum as Sanju's musical gang member
 Damien Mavis as the Spanish ambassador
 Steven Dasz as Henchman
 Kaajal Vashisht
 Devshi Khanduri in item number

Production
In September, Amala Paul was selected to play one of the female leads. First the makers chose Tapsee Pannu for another role, which was later received by Richa Gangopadhyay. But Richa was officially replaced and Tapsee Pannu was selected as the second female lead in the movie. Later, Catherine Tresa replaced her. Chakri was the initial choice for music director but Devi Sri Prasad was hired later. The film was officially launched on 18 October 2012 at Ramanaidu Studios in Hyderabad. Filming took place in Spain in February 2013. First Look of the movie was launched on 10 March 2013. The director winded up films and went to shot digitally using Arri Alexa cameras with ultra primelenses. A theatrical trailer was released on the occasion of Allu Arjun's birthday on 8 April 2013.

Soundtrack

Devi Sri Prasad, composed the music, collaborating for the sixth time with Allu Arjun and for the first time with Suraj Jagan. Pop and reggae singer Apache Indian has teamed up for Devi Sri Prasad to sing a song in this film, which is the first time Apache Indian has sung a Telugu song in his career. The audio launch took place on 29 April 2013 at Shilpakala Vedika in Hyderabad.

Reception

The audio got positive response. APHerald.com gave a review stating "Refreshing tracks from Devi Sri Prasad and this time stylish star Allu Arjun got stylish songs too from DSP." Cineoutlook.com gave a review stating "Very good musical scores. Going to rock in the coming days…"

Release
The film's overseas rights are owned by Blue Sky for approximately  It released worldwide on 31 May 2013 with a U/A Certificate from the Censor Board. The movie released in a record no. of 175+ screens in overseas by Bluesky with Digital Quality on 30 May 2013.

The film was also dubbed and released in Hindi as Dangerous Khiladi 2 in 2014.

Reception
Jeevi of idlebrain.com gave a rating of 3 on a scale of 5 and opined that the first half is entertaining. "It's a stylish film though emotions didn't work." Mahesh S Koneru of 123telugu.com gave a review stating "'Iddarammayilatho' is a very stylish offering from Puri Jagan. Allu Arjun's performance, Catherine's glamour and the action sequences are assets for the film. The slow pace in the second half and the absence of traditional Puri Jagan elements like heroism and punch dialogues might hamper the overall experience." Girija Narayan of Oneindia Entertainment gave a review stating "Iddarammayilatho is definitely a good movie to watch. The movie gets a lot more interesting in the second half. The climax definitely lets the viewers go home happy." Sasidhar AS of The Times of India gave a review stating, "Iddarammayilatho hits you like fresh air, and you instantly fall for the lead characters, refreshingly flesh-and-blood with their set of quirks, flaws and strengths. The first half does ramble a bit and takes time to build up into a riveting second half." APHerald.com gave a review stating "Iddarammayilatho is one time watcher and entire credit goes to Puri Jagannadh." SuperGoodMovies gave a review stating "'Iddarammayilatho' is a beautiful and stylish movie of Allu Arjun and Puri Jagannath. Definitely, it is a worthy watch."

Box Office

India
The film had a good start in A, B and C Centres in its first weekend. The film collected  on its opening day at worldwide circuits which is a record for Allu Arjun. The film continued to gross steady revenues at all areas, receiving much better response at A Centres, when compared to B and C Centres. The film completed 50 Days in 19 Direct Centers on 19 July 2013.

Overseas
The movie collected a total of 9174,000 in just 3 days of release. At its opening weekend, the movie collected a total of 17.1 million at the USA Box office.
Iddaramyilatho was a good grosser at overseas. It collected $1 million in its full run. Iddaramyilatho earned  through premier shows in the U.S. even before its release. Despite of mixed reviews movie collected total worldwide .

References

External links
 

2013 films
2010s Telugu-language films
Films set in Barcelona
Films shot in Barcelona
Films shot in Paris
Indian romantic action films
Indian martial arts films
Films about mining
Films directed by Puri Jagannadh
Films scored by Devi Sri Prasad
Indian nonlinear narrative films
2013 martial arts films